Joshua Pim (1748–1822) was a Dublin merchant active in the cotton trade in Dublin in the late 18th and early 19th century, who made significant input into setting up the Dublin Chamber of Commerce.

Biography
Joshua Pim was born in 1748, the son of John (Joshua) Pim (1718—1797).

Joshua and Joseph and traded as Joshua and Joseph Pim of Usher's Island which was subsequently taken over by George.  Their address, 15 Usher's Island opposite James Joyce Bridge featured in "The Dead".

In 1783, Joshua Pim in conjunction with John Patrick drafted the theoretical basis for the Dublin Chamber of Commerce which carried on the work of the former Committee of Merchants.  Joshua Pim acted both as treasurer and information officer.

Joshua did not marry, and his death in 1822 was preceded by his brother and partner Joseph in 1806.  His amassed fortune and business interests passed to his nephew George Pim.

Family

John Pim
John (Joshua) Pim (1718—1797) was the father of Joshua and who started up the business.

Sarah Grubb

Sarah Grubb was the eldest child of John Pim and a sister to Joshua.  Following her husband's death in 1784 after only six years of marriage she ran the Mills at Clonmel with some assistance from Joshua.

Joseph Pim

Joseph Pim was a brother of Joshua and their business was typically styled as Joshua and Joseph Pim of Usher's Island

Richard Pim
Richard was a brother of Joshua and is described as a merchant and storekeeper.  He became involved in a brewing business at City Quay around 1800.  Richard Pim's business ventures ran into difficulties and various partnerships with branches of the Pim family and other Quaker families.  Richard Pim eventually became bankrupt and fell into being disowned by the Quakers; the brewery eventually becoming controlled by James Pim and then his son Henry Pim (father and brother of James Pim junior), before eventually merging into Jameson).

George Pim
Joshua Pim was not married and left his considerable estate and business interests to his nephew George Pim.

Notes

References

Sources
 

Irish Quakers
18th-century Irish businesspeople
1748 births
1822 deaths
19th-century Irish businesspeople